de Smith may refer to:

Casey DeSmith (born 1991), American ice hockey goaltender 
Stanley Alexander de Smith (1922–1974), English academic lawyer and author
DeMaurice Smith (born 1964), the executive director of the National Football League Players Association (NFLPA)